The relationship between Uruguay and the International Monetary Fund (IMF) began when Uruguay joined the IMF

International Monetary Fund 
The IMF is an international organization founded in 1944 as part of the Bretton Woods Conference. Its primary purpose is to increase financial stability in member countries, with financial means ranging from loans to credit offers. Uruguay is a country in South America. It is a member of the IMF. The economy of Uruguay is diverse, with 7.5% of Gross domestic product (GDP) originating from agriculture, 10% from tourism and 20.6% from industry. As of 2017, Uruguay had the ninth largest GDP in South America and the 96th globally.

Assistance 
Uruguay is a beneficiary of IMF intervention, although it has not undergone any of the substantial macroeconomic changes mandated by the IMF and no projects have been completed there. However, multiple arrangements have been made for the IMF to provide the country with standby credit (funds to be used as a last resort in the event of due payment to a third party), the first of which was arranged in 1996. This is in line with the institution's goal of achieving and supporting economic stability. These standby credit lines started during a time of significant economic growth (5% year-over-year), but also at a time of heavy dollarization (alignment with/dependency on the U.S. Dollar). For context, as of 2008, 60% of Uruguay's bank loans use U.S. Dollars as opposed to the national currency, the Uruguayan peso.

In general, these stand-by arrangements have been available for terms of one to two years, each valued in the range of 150 - 2000 SDR (108 million - US$1.5 billion). Additionally, the Uruguayan government has utilized 72% of funds made available to them between 2000 and 2006, the last arrangement expiring in December 2006. As of May 2017, the Uruguayan government owes 380,000 SDR (US$274,502.88) to the IMF, which represents less than 0.00001% of the GDP, standing at US$53.44 billion as of June 2017.

Usage and effects 

In concert with these stand-by arrangements, the Uruguayan government has been relatively successful in its implementation of a “gradual anti-inflation strategy” started in the 1990s. Inflation has slowed to 9% in 2017, versus a peak of 140%. However, it is greater than the government's goal of 6%. In addition, Uruguay maintains a high degree of liquidity (the ability to turn its assets into cash). The IMF speculated that an economic downturn in neighbouring countries Argentina and Brazil, as well as a slowdown in China, are contributing factors to Uruguay's slowed economic growth. Despite this, Uruguay's heavy utilization of IMF credit has been heavily correlated with its lasting stability in the South American region. Additionally, Uruguay has been able to keep pace with, or in some cases outperform, the GDP growth rate of neighbouring countries: Brazil and Argentina.

References 

IMF chief Christine Lagarde warns of 'dark future' over climate change

International Monetary Fund relations